Görel Thurdin (born 26 May 1942) is Swedish politician who served as the minister of physical planning and the minister of environment in the 1990s, and was a member of the Swedish Parliament.

Biography
Thurdin was born in Västerås on 26 May 1942. She is a graduate of Umeå University. She began her political career as a member of the municipal board in Örnsköldsvik and was in office until 1985. Then she was elected to the Swedish Parliament in 1986 for Centre Party. Next year she was made the second vice chair of the party.  

Thurdin was the minister of physical planning in the period of 1991–1994 and minister of environment in 1994. She also acted as the deputy speaker of the Swedish Parliament. As of 2009, she headed the UNESCO council in Sweden. She was also the chair of International Save the Children Alliance.

References

External links

20th-century Swedish women politicians
21st-century Swedish women politicians
1942 births
Deputy speakers of the Riksdag
Living people
Members of the Riksdag 1985–1988
Members of the Riksdag from the Centre Party (Sweden)
People from Västerås
Swedish Ministers for the Environment
Swedish officials of the United Nations
Umeå University alumni
Women government ministers of Sweden
Women members of the Riksdag